The archery competition at the 2018 Central American and Caribbean Games was held in Barranquilla, Colombia from 29 July to 3 August at the Estadio Lulio González.

Medal summary

Men's events

Women's events

Mixed events

Medal table

References

External links
2018 Central American and Caribbean Games – Archery

2018 Central American and Caribbean Games events
Central American and Caribbean Games
2018
Central American and Caribbean Games